Francesco de Leo (died 1562) was a Roman Catholic prelate who served as Bishop of Trevico (1548–1562).

On 13 July 1548, Francesco de Leo was appointed during the papacy of Pope Paul III as Bishop of Trevico.
He served as Bishop of Trevico until his death in 1562.

References

External links and additional sources
 (for the Chronology of Bishops using non-Latin names) 
 (for the Chronology of Bishops using non-Latin names)  

16th-century Italian Roman Catholic bishops
Bishops appointed by Pope Paul III
1562 deaths